Wassermann Lake is a lake in Carver County, Minnesota, in the United States.

Wassermann Lake was named for Michael Wassermann, a pioneer settler.

See also
List of lakes in Minnesota

References

Lakes of Minnesota
Lakes of Carver County, Minnesota